Straight to the Point is the only studio album by American contemporary R&B singer Damion Hall. It's lone single, "Satisfy You" featuring Chanté Moore, reached No. 28 on the Billboard R&B singles chart.  The album included production by Brian McKnight and Hall himself.

Track listing 
 Let's Get It Going On
 Love's Knockin'
 Crazy About You
 Do Me Like You Wanna Be Done
 A Song for You (duet with Aaron Hall)
 Satisfy You (duet with Chanté Moore)
 Holdin' On
 Lost Inside of You
 Never Enough
 Second Chance
 Now or Never
 Long Lasting Love Affair
 Black as You Wanna Be
 Satisfy You

References 

1994 albums
Damion Hall albums